is a men's volleyball team based in Mishima city, Shizuoka, Japan. They play in V.League Division 1. The owner of the team is Toray Industries.

History
The club was founded in 1947 in Ōtsu, Shiga Prefecture as Toyo Rayon Kurin Kai. They initially played nine-player volleyball. They moved to Mishima in 1964 and started to play six-player volleyball. They were described as the strongest team in the second-tier league but when they were promoted to the top-flight, they found themselves languishing in the wrong end of the table. However, since they returned to the Japan Volleyball League in the 1988-1989 season, they established themselves as a top-flight team.

Toray Arrows won All Japan Championship in 2002 and the V.League in the 2004–05, 2008-09 season.

Toray Arrows joined 2018 Asian Men's Club Volleyball Championship to represent Japan and ranked the 5th place.

Current Roster
The following is team roster of Season 2022-2023
{|class="wikitable sortable" style="font-size:100%; text-align:center;"
! colspan="6"| Team roster – Season 2022-2023|-
!style="width:4em; color:#FFFFFF; background-color:#0018A8"|No.
!style="width:10em; color:#FFFFFF; background-color:#0018A8"|Name
!style="width:14em; color:#FFFFFF; background-color:#0018A8"|Date of birth
!style="width:9em; color:#FFFFFF; background-color:#0018A8"|Height
!style="width:9em; color:#FFFFFF; background-color:#0018A8"|Position
|-bgcolor=#FDEE00
||| style="text-align:left;" ||| style="text-align:right;" |||||Middle Blocker
|-bgcolor=#FDEE00
||| style="text-align:left;" ||| style="text-align:right;" |||||Middle Blocker
|-bgcolor=#FDEE00
||| style="text-align:left;" ||| style="text-align:right;" |||||Libero
|-bgcolor=#FDEE00
||| style="text-align:left;" ||| style="text-align:right;" |||||Setter
|-bgcolor=#FDEE00
||| style="text-align:left;" ||| style="text-align:right;" |||||Outside Hitter
|-bgcolor=#FDEE00
||| style="text-align:left;" ||| style="text-align:right;" |||||Outside Hitter
|-bgcolor=#FDEE00
|||| style="text-align:left;" | (c)|| style="text-align:right;" |||||Outside Hitter
|-bgcolor=#FDEE00
|||| style="text-align:left;" ||| style="text-align:right;" |||||Setter
|-bgcolor=#FDEE00
||| style="text-align:left;" ||| style="text-align:right;" |||||Outside Hitter
|-bgcolor=#FDEE00
|14|| style="text-align:left;" | || style="text-align:right;" |||||Opposite
|-bgcolor=#FDEE00
|15|| style="text-align:left;" ||| style="text-align:right;" |||||Middle Blocker
|-bgcolor=#FDEE00
|16|| style="text-align:left;" ||| style="text-align:right;" |||||Middle Blocker
|-bgcolor=#FDEE00
|17|| style="text-align:left;" ||| style="text-align:right;" |||||Outside Hitter
|-bgcolor=#FDEE00
|18|| style="text-align:left;" ||| style="text-align:right;" |||||Middle Blocker
|-bgcolor=#FDEE00
|21|| style="text-align:left;" ||| style="text-align:right;" |||||Setter
|-bgcolor=#FDEE00
|colspan=5| Head coach:  Ayumu Shinoda
|}

Notable Players
Local Players
 Yuta Yoneyama (2007–present)
 Naonobu Fujii (2014–2023)

Foreign Players
 Lloy Ball (1996-1999)
 Pavel Abramov (2003-2005)
 Vladimir Nikolov (2006-2007)

Honours
Japan Volleyball League/V.League/V.Premier League
Champions  (×3): 2004-05, 2008-09, 2016–17
Runners-up  (×6): 1998-99, 1999-00, 2001-02, 2006-07, 2007-08 and 2011-12
Kurowashiki All Japan Volleyball Championship
Champions  (×6): 1961, 1963, 2002, 2005, 2006 and 2011
Runners-up  (×4): 1953, 1959, 2004 and 2009
Emperor's Cup
Champions  (×2): 2008, 2013
Runner-up  (×3): 2012, 2019, 2022

League results
 Champion'''   Runner-up

References

Japanese volleyball teams
Volleyball clubs established in 1947
Sports teams in Shizuoka Prefecture
Mitsui
1947 establishments in Japan
Toray Industries